The Chichali Formation is an Early to "Middle Cretaceous" geologic formation in Pakistan. Plesiosaur remains are among the fossils that have been recovered from its strata. The formation comprises laterites, glauconitic sandstones and carbonaceous green shales deposited on an outer ramp in the Nizampur Basin.

See also 
 Plesiosaur stratigraphic distribution

References

Bibliography 
 

Geologic formations of Pakistan
Cretaceous System of Asia
Sandstone formations
Mudstone formations
Open marine deposits
Paleontology in Pakistan